Pathsala is a town that is the district headquarters of Bajali district in the Indian state of Assam with a population of nearly 11.5 thousand (as per 2011 census) and an area of 2.74 square kilometre size. Well known for its mobile theatres spreading niche entertainment around and beyond the state. Pathsala is also one of the top educational hubs of Assam for having a number of educational institutes most importantly junior colleges for 10+2 level.

Bajali district is a newly formed district of the Indian state of Assam, carved out from the district of Barpeta. It was formed on 10 August 2020 by a government order of former Assam Chief Minister Sarbananda Sonowal.

Demographics
 Indian Census, Pathsala Town Area is divided into 10 wards, and elections for the Town Area Committee are held every 5 years.

The Pathsala Town Committee was established in 1968.

Population 
Pathsala Town has a population of 11,242 of which 5,824 (51.8%) are males while 5,418 (48.19%) are females. Population of Children with age of 0-6 is 1040 which is 9.25% of the total population.

Sex Ratio 
There are 930 females per 1000 male in Pathsala (TC). Overall sex ratio in the city has increased by 89 females per 1000 male during the years from 2001 to 2011. Child sex ratio here has decreased by 33 girls per 1000 boys during the same time.

Literacy 
Total 9467 people in the city are literate, among them 5029 are male and 4438 are female. Literacy rate (children under 6 are excluded) of Pathsala is 93%. 95% of male and 90% of female population are literate here. Overall literacy rate in the city has increased by 4%. Male literacy has gone up by 2% and female literacy rate has gone up by 6%.

Worker's Profile 

Pathsala Town Committee administers over 2,759 houses, to which it supplies basic amenities, like water and sewerage. It is also authorized to build roads within the Town Committee limits and impose taxes on properties coming under its jurisdiction.

Culture

Mobile Theatres 
Pathsala is a focal point of mobile theatre, popularly known as Bhramyaman Theatre, in Assam. These groups, similar to the Jatra groups of Bengal, have carved a special niche as mass entertainers in Northeast India, arranging shows throughout Assam and some of its neighbouring states. Sessions usually start from June/July every year, putting up plays from the month August/September and concluding the session in March/April. Every group has their own set of artists and technicians, along with stages, pandals, and other electric and sound equipment, which they carry to the remotest parts of the region. At present, Pathsala boasts three prominent Bhramyaman groups, namely The Kohinoor Theatre, The Aabahan Theatre and The Rajmukut Theatre.Nataraj Theatre, the first mobile theatre of Assam, originated in pathsala

Deodhani Dance 
The famous Deodhani Dance, entirely different from its South Indian form, has Pathsala as its home. Assam's Devadasi dance is a 1,000-year-old tradition, prevalent since the 7th century when the Devadasi system was in place. Girls were offered to Saiva, Sakta and Vaishnava temples to dance as part of a daily ritual. Ancient texts like the Kalika Purana and Yogini Tantra  carry references to this ritualistic dance practice. It is said that Bishnu Prasad Rabha, on seeing it performed, worked for the promotion and spread of this dance form. Dilip Kakati is the person who currently trains a group of girls, in an attempt to save this art.

Education
Pathsala is among the top educational hubs in Assam, producing toppers in both SEBA and AHSEC Exams.

Bajali Higher Secondary School, established in 1926 and Bajali College (now upgraded to Bhattadev University) established in 1955 are the oldest educational institutions in the area.

Apart from these government funded institutions, there are several private institutions. Shankardev Shishu Vidya Niketan, Pathsala Sikshapith Adarsha High School and Junior College, Anundoram Borooah Academy, Krishna Kanta Handiqui Senior Secondary School and Degree College etc. are some of private institutions of note.

Transportation
Railways: Pathsala Town is well connected by Indian Railways with places like Kolkata, Guwahati, Barpeta Road, Bongaigaon etc.
 
This is a list of trains to different places from Pathsala:

Roads:  The National Highway 31 (India) runs through Pathsala and has connectivity to all parts of Assam. The National Highway 152 (India), connecting Bhutan with Assam, starts from Pathsala.

References

Cities and towns in Bajali district